Lomatium nevadense is a species of flowering plant in the carrot family known by the common name Nevada biscuitroot. It is native to the western United States and northern Mexico, where it is known from several different habitat types, including sagebrush and woodlands. It is a perennial herb growing up to about 45 centimeters tall from a taproot. The leaves are up to about 16 centimeters long, their blades divided into many oblong pointed segments. The inflorescence is an umbel of white or cream flowers.

External links
 Calflora Database: Lomatium nevadense (Nevada biscuitroot,  Nevada lomatium)
Jepson Manual eFlora treatment of Lomatium nevadense
USDA Plants Profile for Lomatium nevadense (Nevada biscuitroot)
UC CalPhotos gallery

nevadense
Flora of Northwestern Mexico
Flora of California
Flora of Nevada
Flora of the Great Basin
Flora of the Sierra Nevada (United States)
Flora of Arizona
Flora of New Mexico
Flora of Oregon
Flora of Utah
Natural history of the Mojave Desert
Natural history of the Transverse Ranges
Taxa named by John Merle Coulter
Taxa named by Sereno Watson
Plants described in 1876
Flora without expected TNC conservation status